Batn Gharran was a location in Saudi Arabia during the Islamic Prophet Muhammad's era. Muhammad ordered the Invasion of Banu Lahyan which took place here. Muhammad set out in Rabi‘ Al-Awwal or Jumada Al-Ula in the year six Hijri (July 627 A.D) with 200 Muslim fighters and made a feint of heading for Syria, then soon changed route towards Batn Gharran, the scene of where 10 Muslims were killed in the Expedition of Al Raji.

See also
List of battles of Muhammad

References

Populated places in Mecca Province